The 2011 Nigerian Senate election in Kano State was held on April 9, 2011, to elect members of the Nigerian Senate to represent Kano State. Basheer Garba Mohammed representing Kano Central and Bello Hayatu Gwarzo representing Kano North won on the platform of Peoples Democratic Party, while Kabiru Ibrahim Gaya representing Kano South won on the platform of All Nigeria Peoples Party.

Overview

Summary

Results

Kano Central 
Peoples Democratic Party candidate Basheer Garba Mohammed won the election, defeating other party candidates.

Kano North 
Peoples Democratic Party candidate Bello Hayatu Gwarzo won the election, defeating other party candidates.

Kano South 
All Nigeria Peoples Party candidate Kabiru Ibrahim Gaya won the election, defeating other party candidates.

References 

Kano State Senate elections
Kano State senatorial elections
Kano State senatorial elections